Aidan Murphy (born 17 September 1967) is an English former professional footballer who made 123 appearances in the Football League. He is now a youth soccer coach in Greensboro, North Carolina, United States.

Player
Murphy, a midfielder, signed a professional contract with Manchester United on his 17th birthday. He was part of the FA Youth Cup team that played Manchester City in the 1986 FA Youth Cup Final. In October 1986 he spent a month on loan with Lincoln City, making his league debut in the 4–1 home defeat to Hartlepool United on 5 October 1986. In February 1987, he linked up with Oldham Athletic, again on a one-month loan deal, but failed to make a league appearance.

In the summer of 1987, Murphy was released by Manchester United and joined Crewe Alexandra where he was to spend the next five seasons. He had 113 league appearances. A short spell with Scarborough at the beginning of the 1992–1993 season signalled the end of his league career and he dropped into the non-league ranks to enjoy short spells with Woking, Mossley and Witton Albion.

In 1993, he emigrated to America and joined the Greensboro-based Carolina Dynamo for their inaugural season. He went on to spend three seasons in their team before moving on to spells with Minnesota Rampage and Raleigh Flyers. On 19 March 1998, he joined the Minnesota Thunder. He retired at the end of the season.

Coaching
Murphy moved into coaching, becoming a staff coach with Greensboro Youth Soccer in 1998. In 2001, he was appointed Boys Youth Development Director for GYS. He has also been on the staff of the NCYSA Olympic development program since Spring 2000. He moved to the South Charlotte Soccer Association in May 2006 but returned to Greensboro in October 2006 due to a family illness. He is currently a coach with Greensboro United Soccer Association.

References

External links
Carolina Dynamo All-time player stats

1967 births
Living people
English footballers
Manchester United F.C. players
Lincoln City F.C. players
Oldham Athletic A.F.C. players
Crewe Alexandra F.C. players
Scarborough F.C. players
Woking F.C. players
Witton Albion F.C. players
Mossley A.F.C. players
English Football League players
Footballers from Manchester
USISL players
North Carolina Fusion U23 players
Raleigh Flyers players
Minnesota Thunder players
Association football midfielders
English expatriate sportspeople in the United States
Expatriate soccer players in the United States
English expatriate footballers